Robert Morris (1745 – June 2, 1815) was chief justice of the Supreme Court of New Jersey and a United States district judge of the United States District Court for the District of New Jersey, the United States District Court for the Eastern District of New Jersey and the United States District Court for the Western District of New Jersey.

Education and career

Born in 1745, in New Brunswick, Province of New Jersey, British America, Morris read law in 1770. He entered private practice in New Brunswick from 1770 to 1776. On September 6, 1776, by Joint Meeting of the New Jersey Legislature, Morris was appointed Clerk of Bergen County. On February 5, 1777, the Legislature named him Chief Justice of the Supreme Court of New Jersey, the office once held by his father. On November 6, 1778 Morris resigned as Bergen County Clerk. He continued to serve as Chief Justice until his resignation from that office on May 25, 1779. He resumed private practice in New Brunswick from 1779 to 1790.

Federal judicial service

Morris received a recess appointment from President George Washington on August 28, 1790, to a seat on the United States District Court for the District of New Jersey vacated by Judge David Brearley. He was nominated to the same position by President Washington on December 17, 1790. He was confirmed by the United States Senate on December 20, 1790, and received his commission the same day. His service terminated on June 2, 1815, due to his death in New Brunswick.

Family

Morris was the son of New Jersey Chief Justice Robert Hunter Morris and grandson of former Governor Lewis Morris.

References

Sources
 

1745 births
1815 deaths
Morris family (Morrisania and New Jersey)
Chief Justices of the Supreme Court of New Jersey
Justices of the Supreme Court of New Jersey
Judges of the United States District Court for the District of New Jersey
United States federal judges appointed by George Washington
18th-century American judges
United States federal judges admitted to the practice of law by reading law